Gubbare TV is an Indian multilanguage ( Hindi, Tamil, Telugu and English) kids entertainment channel that was owned by IN10 Media Network. This channel targets the kids from the age of 2–14 years.

Programming

Current programming 
  Akul Nakul The Asuras 
 Roro Aur Hero, Bhoot Mast,Zabardast
 ViR: The Robot Boy
 Angry Birds

Former programming 
 Appu- The Yogic Elephant
 Atchoo
 Billa Jasoos
 Dabang Girls
 Fred Kismatwala
 Krishna Balram
 Leo & Tig
 Luv Kushh
 Marcus Khiladi
 My Bhoot Friends
  Akki Jaanbaaz

References

External links 
 Official Website

2020 establishments in Maharashtra
Children's television channels in India
Television channels and stations established in 2020
Television stations in Mumbai
Indian animation
Hindi-language television channels in India
IN10 Media Network